Burford was a rural district in Shropshire in England from 1894 to 1934.

It was formed under the Local Government Act 1894 that part of the Tenbury rural sanitary district which was in Shropshire (the bulk forming Tenbury Rural District in Worcestershire).  It consisted of the parishes of Boraston, Burford, Greete, Nash and Whitton.

It was abolished in 1934 by a county review order made under the Local Government Act 1929, with its area being transferred to the Ludlow Rural District.

References
https://web.archive.org/web/20070930231908/http://www.visionofbritain.org.uk/relationships.jsp?u_id=10136507
https://web.archive.org/web/20041205130444/http://users.ox.ac.uk/~peter/workhouse/Tenbury/Tenbury.html

History of Shropshire
Local government in Shropshire
Districts of England created by the Local Government Act 1894
Rural districts of England